Cooperator may refer to:

cooperators of Opus Dei
a cooperative member
Cooperation
Contingent cooperator
see also: Collaboration
Frater et Cooperator Imperii ("Brother and Partner of the Empire") title given to Boleslaus I of Poland

Operator (disambiguation)

See also 
 The Co-operators, a Canadian insurance co-operative